José António Calado da Silva (born 1 March 1974), known as Calado, is a Portuguese former footballer who played as a central midfielder.

After coming to prominence in his own country with Benfica, he spent the rest of his 19-year career with two teams in Spain and two in Cyprus. He amassed Primeira Liga totals of 184 games and seven goals, over eight seasons.

Club career
Calado was born in Lisbon. During his early career, started with local Casa Pia AC, he represented C.F. Estrela da Amadora and S.L. Benfica, reaching international status with the latter club.

In the summer of 2001 Calado, alongside teammate João Tomás, joined La Liga side Real Betis, but both failed to settle, with the midfielder only appearing 20 times during two seasons. From 2003 to 2005 he played on loan with Segunda División team Polideportivo Ejido, and the move was subsequently made permanent.

After 100 league matches with 15 goals (he missed the entire 2006–07 campaign due to injury), Calado moved to Cyprus, first with APOP Kinyras FC, joining AEP Paphos FC for 2008–09. He appeared regularly for both clubs during his Cypriot First Division spell, eventually leaving the latter in early 2010 and retiring at age 36.

International career
Calado won four caps for the Portugal national team during four years, and also represented the nation at the 1996 Summer Olympics.

Honours
Benfica
Taça de Portugal: 1995–96

References

External links

1974 births
Living people
Footballers from Lisbon
Portuguese footballers
Association football midfielders
Primeira Liga players
Liga Portugal 2 players
Casa Pia A.C. players
C.F. Estrela da Amadora players
S.L. Benfica footballers
La Liga players
Segunda División players
Real Betis players
Polideportivo Ejido footballers
Cypriot First Division players
APOP Kinyras FC players
AEP Paphos FC players
Portugal under-21 international footballers
Portugal international footballers
Footballers at the 1996 Summer Olympics
Portuguese expatriate footballers
Expatriate footballers in Spain
Expatriate footballers in Cyprus
Portuguese expatriate sportspeople in Spain
Portuguese expatriate sportspeople in Cyprus
Olympic footballers of Portugal